The 2017 Volta Limburg Classic was a one-day road cycling race that took place on 1 April 2017. It was the 44th edition of the Volta Limburg Classic and was rated as a 1.1 event as part of the 2017 UCI Europe Tour.

The race was won by Marco Canola.

Teams
Twenty-two teams were invited to take part in the race. These included two UCI WorldTeams, eight UCI Professional Continental teams and twelve UCI Continental teams.

Result

References

External links

2017
2017 UCI Europe Tour
2017 in Dutch sport